The 1949 Pittsburgh Steelers season was the franchise's 17th in the National Football League, and the second season with John Michelosen as head coach. The team finished the season with a record of 6–5-1, improving slightly from the previous season record of 4-8, but again failing to qualify for the playoffs.

Regular season

Schedule

Note: Intra-division opponents are in bold text.

Game summaries

Week 1 (Sunday September 25, 1949): New York Giants 

at Forbes Field, Pittsburgh, Pennsylvania

 Game time: 
 Game weather: 
 Game attendance: 20,957
 Referee: 
 TV announcers: 

Scoring drives:

 Pittsburgh – Nickel 52 pass from Gage (Glamp kick)
 Pittsburgh – Nuzum 9 run (Glamp kick)
 Pittsburgh – Samuel 31 run (Glamp kick)
 Pittsburgh – Geri 2 run (Glamp kick)
 New York Giants – Poole 13 pass from Conerly (Agajanian kick)

Week 2 (Monday October 3, 1949): Washington Redskins  

at Forbes Field, Pittsburgh, Pennsylvania

 Game time: 
 Game weather: 
 Game attendance: 30,000
 Referee: 
 TV announcers: 

Scoring drives:

 Washington – Taylor 24 pass from Baugh (kick failed)
 Pittsburgh – Shipkey 2 run (Glamp kick)
 Pittsburgh – Nuzum 27 run (Glamp kick)
 Washington – Sandifer 35 pass from Baugh (Poillon kick)
 Washington – Taylor 58 pass from Baugh (Poillon kick)
 Washington – Goode 1 run (Poillon kick)

Week 3 (Saturday October 8, 1949): Washington Redskins  

at Forbes Field, Pittsburgh, Pennsylvania

 Game time: 
 Game weather: 
 Game attendance: 21,355
 Referee: 
 TV announcers: 

Scoring drives:

 Pittsburgh – Shipkey 1 run (Glamp kick)
 Pittsburgh – Shipkey 2 run (Glamp kick)
 Detroit – Doll 95 interception (Dudley kick)

Week 4 (Sunday October 16, 1949): New York Giants  

at Polo Grounds, New York, New York

 Game time: 
 Game weather: 
 Game attendance: 29,911
 Referee: 
 TV announcers: 

Scoring drives:

 Pittsburgh – Geri 3 run (Glamp kick)
 New York Giants – FG Agajanian 38
 New York Giants – Scott 4 run (Agajanian kick)
 New York Giants – Scott 2 run (Agajanian kick)
 Pittsburgh – Samuelson 26 fumble run (Glamp kick)
 Pittsburgh – Jansante 29 pass from Finks (Glamp kick)

Week 5 (Sunday October 23, 1949): New York Bulldogs  

at Forbes Field, Pittsburgh, Pennsylvania

 Game time: 
 Game weather: 
 Game attendance: 22,042
 Referee: 
 TV announcers: 

Scoring drives:

 Pittsburgh – Nuzum 25 run (Glamp kick)
 New York Bulldogs – Layne 1 run (Scollard kick)
 Pittsburgh – FG Glamp 17
 Pittsburgh – Geri 3 run (Glamp kick)
 New York Bulldogs – FG Scollard 27
 New York Bulldogs – FG Scollard 25
 Pittsburgh – Nuzum 6 run (Glamp kick)

Week 6 (Sunday October 30, 1949): Philadelphia Eagles  

at Forbes Field, Pittsburgh, Pennsylvania

 Game time: 
 Game weather: 
 Game attendance: 37,903
 Referee: 
 TV announcers: 

Scoring drives:

 Philadelphia – FG Patton 48
 Philadelphia – Van Buren 1 run (Muha kick)
 Philadelphia – Scott 70 punt return (Muha kick)
 Philadelphia – Van Buren 6 run (Muha kick)
 Pittsburgh – Jansante 35 pass from Finks (Glamp kick)
 Philadelphia – Thompson 1 run (Muha kick)
 Philadelphia – Pihos 15 pass from Mackrides (Muha kick)

Week 7 (Sunday November 6, 1949): Washington Redskins  

at Griffith Stadium, Washington, DC

 Game time: 
 Game weather: 
 Game attendance: 
 Referee: 
 TV announcers: 

Scoring drives:

 Washington – Taylor 51 pass from Gilmer (Poillon kick)
 Pittsburgh – Finks 5 run (Glamp kick)
 Pittsburgh – Shipkey 1 run (Glamp kick)
 Washington – Stout 74 run (Poillon kick)
 Washington – Stout 1 run (kick failed)
 Washington -Dowda 1 run (Poillon kick)

Week 8 (Sunday November 13, 1949): Los Angeles Rams  

at Forbes Field, Pittsburgh, Pennsylvania

 Game time: 
 Game weather: 
 Game attendance: 20,510
 Referee: 
 TV announcers: 

Scoring drives:

 Pittsburgh – Geri 18 run (Glamp kick)
 Los Angeles – Gehrke 1 run (Waterfield kick)

Week 9 (Sunday November 20, 1949): Green Bay Packers  

at City Stadium, Green Bay, Wisconsin

 Game time: 
 Game weather: 
 Game attendance: 
 Referee: 
 TV announcers: 

Scoring drives:

 Pittsburgh – Jansante 47 pass from Geri (Geri kick)
 Pittsburgh – Nuzum 64 run (Geri kick)
 Green Bay – Girard 1 run (Fritsch kick)
 Pittsburgh – Safety, Girard's punt blocked out of end zone by Samuelson
 Pittsburgh – Nuzum 8 pass from Geri (Geri kick)
 Pittsburgh – Gage 3 run (Geri kick)

Week 10 (Sunday November 27, 1949): Philadelphia Eagles  

at Shibe Park, Philadelphia, Pennsylvania

 Game time: 
 Game weather: 
 Game attendance: 22,191
 Referee: 
 TV announcers: 

Scoring drives:

 Philadelphia – Armstrong 13 pass from Thompson (Patton kick)
 Pittsburgh – Nuzum 67 pass from Geri (Geri kick)
 Philadelphia – FG Patton 16
 Pittsburgh – FG Geri 34
 Philadelphia – Ferrante 3 pass from Thompson (Patton kick)
 Philadelphia – Parmer 1 run (Patton kick)
 Philadelphia – FG Patton 13
 Pittsburgh – Nickel 40 pass from Gage (Geri kick)

Week 11 (Sunday December 4, 1949): Chicago Bears  

at Wrigley Field, Chicago, Illinois

 Game time: 
 Game weather: 
 Game attendance: 36,071
 Referee: 
 TV announcers: 

Scoring drives:

 Chicago Bears – Rykovick 20 pass from Lujack (Lujack kick)
 Pittsburgh – Nickel 48 pass from Geri (Geri kick)
 Chicago Bears – Hoffman 3 run (Lujack kick)
 Chicago Bears – FG Blanda 33
 Chicago Bears – Rykovich 1 run (kick failed)
 Chicago Bears – Rykovich 1 run (Lujack kick)
 Pittsburgh – Gage 97 run (Geri kick)
 Pittsburgh – Gage 6 run (Geri kick)

Week 12 (Sunday December 11, 1949): New York Bulldogs  

at Polo Grounds, New York, New York

 Game time: 
 Game weather: 
 Game attendance: 4,028
 Referee: 
 TV announcers: 

Scoring drives:

 Pittsburgh – Shipkey 1 run (kick failed)
 Pittsburgh – Jansante 44 pass from Geri (Geri kick)
 Pittsburgh – Geri 1 run (Geri kick)
 Pittsburgh – Finks 17 pass from Seabright (Geri kick)

Standings

References

Pittsburgh Steelers seasons
Pittsburgh Steelers
Pitts